The Summit League Championship or The Summit League Tournament may refer to:

The Summit League men's basketball tournament, the men's basketball championship tournament
The Summit League women's basketball tournament, the women's basketball championship tournament
The Summit League Men's Soccer Tournament, the men's soccer championship tournament